Guru Teg Bahadur Khalsa Institute of Engineering & Technology (GTBKIET)  is a private college. GTBKIET is located in a village named Chhapianwali about 350 km northwest of  Delhi and about 50 km from Bathinda on the outskirts of the Malout-Ganganagar route.

The college is named after Guru Tegh Bahadur ji, the 9th Guru of Sikhism.

History
In the all India Sikh Education Conference held at Malout in 1988, it was decided that professional educational institutes would be set up to provide opportunities for the growth and development of the youth and thus, GTBKIET was set up. This institution is aimed to function as a pace setter for technical education within the country. It was founded in 1997 by GTB Educational Trust in Malout. All the courses of the institute are approved by All India Council for Technical Education and are affiliated with Punjab Technical University, Jalandhar. and Maharaja Ranjit Singh Punjab Technical University, Bathinda.

Departments

During the partial fulfillment of BTech, the students are required to undergo an industrial training of 6 months in the 4th year. In addition to undergraduate programme, it also offers post graduate program(M Tech) in:

Electrical Engineering
Electronics & Communication Engineering
Civil Engineering
Mech Engineering
Computer Science Engineering

MBA and Phd for all courses are also provided by the institution.

Admissions
Admission to the college for BTech programme is made on the basis of one of the following criteria:
JEE-Main merit

For post graduates to take admission, one has to earn a good GATE score.

Facilities

The facilities offered by GTBKIET includes Library, Hostels, Canteen, Wi-Fi, Sports and placement.

See also
 Malout Institute of Management and Information Technology

References

External links
 Official website of GTBKIET
 Punjab Technical University website

Engineering colleges in Punjab, India
Educational institutions established in 1997
1997 establishments in Punjab, India
Sri Muktsar Sahib district